Harold Steves (born May 29, 1937) is a Canadian politician. Steves is a longtime city councillor on Richmond, British Columbia City Council, first elected in 1969 and re-elected in 1977, after serving one term as the New Democratic Party of British Columbia MLA from 1972 to 1975.

Personal life 
Harold Steves is a descendant of Heinrich Stief and Regina Stahlecker, founders of the Steeves family in North America. Other notable descendants of Heinrich and Regina include William Steeves, a Father of Canadian Confederation. The Steves family, which changed the spelling of their surname upon moving west, is one of Richmond's first founding families, after which the community of Steveston is named. Manoah and Martha Steves were the first settlers in the area, arriving in 1877. They imported the first purebred Holstein cattle into British Columbia, established a dairy to provide milk for the fledgling City of Vancouver and were Western Canada's first seedsmen. Born of Maude and Harold Sr., Harold and wife Kathy reside in the old Steves farmhouse, built in 1917, on what is now an  cattle farm surrounded by residential development. Steves is a graduate of the University of British Columbia with a BSc in Agriculture.

Political life 

In the late 1950s, Richmond Council rezoned 12,000 acres of farmland for residential use.  The Steves farm was rezoned against their wishes. As a result the Steves were not permitted to build a new dairy for a bulk tank when the milk company stopped picking up milk in cans. They went out of the milk business and switched to beef cattle. Steves began a campaign to save farmland. However, when the farm was assessed residential taxes his father appealed the assessment and lost and subsequently sold most of the farm. In the mid-1960s Steves drafted the initial resolutions to NDP conventions to establish an Agricultural Land Bank system in British Columbia. As an MLA he was active in the establishment of the "Agricultural Land Reserve" in 1973 under the Dave Barrett NDP Government and for the following decades, was one of its strongest defenders. He is active in the Farmland Defence League.

In 1978, Steves bought Back Valley Ranch at Cache Creek. It is now owned by the oldest son, Jerry who raises grass fed beef and direct markets it, cut, wrapped and frozen, through the internet at www.stevesfarm.com

Steves is the past chair of the Metro Vancouver Agriculture Committee and is promoting farmland preservation, urban agriculture and food security for the region. He represents Richmond as second director on the board of directors of Metro Vancouver. He was the Lower Mainland Treaty Advisory Committee rep at the treaty table for the Tsawwassen First Nation treaty negotiations.

In the late 1960s, Steves co-founded the Richmond Anti-Pollution Association, one of the first environmental advocacy groups in Canada. Steves has been a director of the BC Groundfish Development Authority which administers quotas for the groundfish industry to prevent over fishing. As a director of the Steveston Harbour Authority he is actively promoting harbour redevelopment and establishment of new fishing businesses.

Steves is chair of the Parks and Recreation & Cultural Services Committee of Richmond Council. He is also a member of the Finance; General Purposes; Planning and the Public Works & Transportation Committees of council. Steves is a council representative to the Agricultural Advisory Committee; the Olympic Oval Advisory Committee alternate; the Richmond Farmers' Institute; the Sea Island Community Association; the Steveston Harbour Authority Board and the Britannia Heritage Shipyard Society.

Electoral Record 
 Top 8 candidates elected — Incumbents marked with "(X)". Elected members' names are in bold

References

1937 births
Canadian activists
Living people
Richmond, British Columbia city councillors
British Columbia New Democratic Party MLAs